The Saudi Railways Organization (SRO) was a state-owned railway company that operated part of Saudi Arabia's rail network, along with the Saudi Railway Company (now Saudi Arabia Railways). The SRO operated a network of railways with a total length of approximately 1,380 kilometers. The network consisted of two main lines. A 449 km passenger line that links Dammam with Riyadh, and a 556 km freight line that connects the King Abdul Aziz Port in Dammam with Riyadh.

There are plans to extend the network to the Red Sea port of Jeddah and, eventually to the borders of Jordan, Yemen, and perhaps all the way to Egypt.

Approval to merge the Saudi Railways Organization and Saudi Railway Company was announced in February 2021, and the Saudi Railways Organization was merged into the Saudi Railway Company (now Saudi Arabia Railways) on 1 April 2021.

Rolling stock

Spanish manufacturer CAF delivered eight fast diesel locomotives in 2012, with one driving van trailer passenger car and four other passenger cars, with a leading power car unit; plus two spare power cars. They are used on the Dammam–Riyadh Line. During 2013 the travel time is 4:15 but there is a target of 3:00 for the future.

Trainsets

Diesel Locomotives

Expansion 
The SRO has several plans to expand the network as part of the Saudi Railway Master Plan 2010-2040 (SRMP). Some of the projects under the plan are:

 Saudi Landbridge: The Landbridge project is aimed at connecting the Red Sea with the Persian Gulf. It will involve the construction of a 950 km line from Jeddah Islamic Port to Riyadh, and a 115 km line from Dammam to Jubail.
 North-South line
 The Gulf Railway project is a propose railway network of 2116 km linking all GCC countries. The length of the track inside Saudi Arabia would be 663 km.
 The SRO also has plans to construct three lines in southern Saudi Arabia to improve the region's connectivity with the rest of the country. The lines are the Taif-Khamis Mushayt–Abha line (706 km), the Jeddah-Jizan line (660 km), and the Yanbu–Jeddah line (350 km).

See also 

 Saudi Arabia Railways
 Rail transport in Saudi Arabia
 Transport in Saudi Arabia
 Haramain High Speed Railway

References 

 Al Ayuni Investment and Contracting Company,Saudi Railway CTW400 Project Main Contractor

1951 establishments in Saudi Arabia
Organizations established in 1951
 
Government agencies of Saudi Arabia
Companies based in Dammam
Government-owned railway companies